Brigadier General Arthur Slade Baker CMG (13 December 1863 – 3 September 1943) was a senior British Army officer during the First World War.

Biography

Born on 13 December 1863, Arthur Slade Baker was educated at Bedford School. He received his first commission as a second lieutenant in the Royal Artillery in 1882, was promoted to the rank of lieutenant on 1 October 1882, to the rank of captain on 1 October 1891, and to the rank of major on 1 April 1900. He served during the Second Boer War in South Africa between 1900 and 1901. In June 1902 he was appointed as Inspector, General Stores division, of the Army Ordnance Department, serving at Woolwich until 1905. He was Deputy Assistant Director at the War Office between 1908 and 1912. He was promoted to the rank of Lieutenant Colonel in 1912. He served during the First World War, and was promoted to the rank of Brigadier General.

Brigadier General Arthur Slade Baker was appointed a Companion of the Order of St Michael and St George in 1915. He retired from the British Army in 1920, and died on 3 September 1943.

References

1863 births
1943 deaths
People educated at Bedford School
British Army generals of World War I
British Army personnel of the Second Boer War
Companions of the Order of St Michael and St George
British Army brigadiers
Royal Artillery officers
Royal Army Ordnance Corps officers